James Roscoe (Bolton) Ltd v Winder [1915] 1 Ch 62 is an English trusts law case, concerning asset tracing.

Facts
Mr Winder was the trustee in bankruptcy for Mr William Wigham, who had bought James Roscoe Ltd in March  1913. Mr Wigham had agreed to give the book debts that were received up to a certain date to the sellers. He collected £455 but kept them in his account, so breaching his agreement and fiduciary duty to the company. He spent all but £25, but put in his own money so the balance on his death was £358. James Roscoe Ltd sued to recover all the money in the account, asking to trace the £358. Mr Winder argued the maximum must be only £25, because that was the lowest intermediate balance. Necessarily the other money had been dissipated, and the surplus cash would need to go to pay other creditors.

Judgment
Sargant J held the company could only trace £25, not £358. Once the money was spent, it was gone, down to the lowest bank balance in the interim. The debtor would have needed to substitute money from others for the purpose of using it for the claimant in order to get a trust impressed again.

See also

English trusts law
Turner v Jacob [2006] EWHC 1317 (Ch), [2008] WTLR 307, Patten J held the Re Hallett presumption of a trustee spending his own money first applies where there are sufficient funds left over in a bank account to satisfy a claim by a beneficiary.
Shalson v Russo, [144] suggested the beneficiary can cherry pick whichever is more favourable, as for physical mixtures. 
Foskett v McKeown, para 132, Lord Millett also.

Notes

References

English trusts case law
High Court of Justice cases
1915 in case law
1915 in British law